Church key may refer to:

 Church key, a type of a bottle opener
 "Church Key", a 1960 instrumental track by California surf group The Revels
 Churchkey Can Company, an American brewery